was a Japanese samurai of the late Edo period, who served as a retainer of the Arima clan of Kurume in northern Kyūshū. He was also a Shinto priest of the Suitengū shrine in Kurume.

Maki took part in the Kinmon Incident of 1864 and committed suicide near Osaka with his men, after being chased and surrounded by Aizu and Shinsengumi troops.

Early life
Maki was born in Kurume in 1813, to Maki Toshiomi, the family head of the hereditary line of Shinto priests who cared for the Suitengū shrine. It was during Maki's childhood that his father was made a full-fledged samurai by Arima Yorinori, the lord of Kurume. When Maki was eleven, his father died, leaving him in charge of the family as well as the shrine.

Intellectual and political career
Combining the teachings he had received from Mitogaku and elsewhere, Maki created a new school of thought called Tenpōgaku, named after the era in which it was founded.

Activity in Kyoto
Maki worked with Okubo Toshimichi of Satsuma, in setting up Shimazu Hisamitsu's trip to Kyoto. In 1862, Maki was implicated in the Terada-ya Incident, and briefly imprisoned.

Last battle and death
Maki took part in the Kinmon Incident of 1864, and joined in Chōshū's attack on Aizu-Satsuma allied forces in Kyoto; however, he was beaten back. He committed suicide with his troops at Mount Tennōzan when he was surrounded by Aizu forces under Hayashi Gonsuke and Jinbo Kuranosuke, and Shinsengumi forces under Kondō Isami. His death poem was: . Maki was buried in Ōyamazaki-chō, Kyoto.

The writer Mitsumasu Kimiaki is Maki's descendant.

Popular portrayals
Maki has appeared in several works of fiction which depict the events of the Bakumatsu era. He is a minor character in Kenji Morita's manga Getsumei Seiki and Minamoto Tarō's manga Fūunjitachi Bakumatsuhen. He also appeared in the 1986 Asahi TV miniseries Byakkotai.

References

Calman, Donald (1992). The Nature and Origins of Japanese Imperialism. London: Routledge.
Harootunian, H.D. (1991). Toward Restoration. Berkeley: University of California Press.
Hoshi, Ryōichi (2001). Bakumatsu no Aizu-han. Tokyo: Chūōkōron-shinsha.
Yamaguchi Ken (1876). Kinse Shiriaku. Trans. by Ernest Mason Satow. Yokohama: F.R. Wetmore.
Yamakawa Hiroshi (1966). Kyoto Shugoshoku shimatsu. Tokyo: Heibonsha.

Further reading
Udaka, Hiroshi (1934). Maki Izumi no kami. Kurume: Kikutake Kinbundō
Yamaguchi, Muneyuki (1973). Maki Izumi. Tokyo: Yoshikawa kōbunkan.

1813 births
1864 deaths
Samurai
Kannushi
Suicides by seppuku
People from Kurume